Cruise for a Corpse (orig. Croisière pour un cadavre) is an adventure game from Delphine Software International, made for the Amiga, Atari ST and IBM PC.

Overview 
The game is designed as a murder investigation. The player assumed the role of Raoul Dusentier, a French police inspector invited to spend some time on Niklos Karaboudjan's boat. Quickly after arriving, Karaboudjan is murdered, and the investigation begins.

The game uses many references to French and Belgian pop culture. Karaboudjan is the name of The Adventures of Tintin character Captain Haddock's cargo ship in the comic The Crab with the Golden Claws. Just like in The Crab with the Golden Claws, crab cans are used to hide objects (in the comic they contain opium, whereas in the game they contain hand grenades).

Reception
Computer Gaming World called Cruise for a Corpse "an admirable recipe for a classic adventure of murder most foul". The magazine liked the rotoscoped animation, but criticized the EGA graphics and "atrocious" code wheel-based copy protection, and concluded that while "Dedicated whodunit aficionados" would enjoy the game, "the general adventure gaming audience" would find it "tedious".

References

External links
 Cruise for a Corpse at Amiga Hall of light
 
 Cruise for a Corpse at Atari Mania
 

1991 video games
Adventure games
Amiga games
Atari ST games
Delphine Software International games
Detective video games
DOS games
Point-and-click adventure games
U.S. Gold games
Video games about police officers
Video games developed in France
Video games scored by Jean Baudlot
Video games set in France
Video games set in the 1920s
ScummVM-supported games
Mystery adventure games